Harold Milne Moyes (28 July 1896 – 18 September 1968) was an Australian rules footballer who played for St Kilda and Melbourne in the Victorian Football League (VFL).

Football
A left footed forward, Moyes started his league career in 1915 with St Kilda Football Club and topped St Kilda's goalkicking with 32 goals.

Due to the war he didn't return to the club until 1919 and every season from 1921 to 1923 he topped St Kilda's goalkicking.

In 1925 he crossed to Melbourne and with 55 goals in 1926 was a vital member of their premiership team that season. He kicked three goals in Melbourne's grand final win over Collingwood and his end of season tally was the third highest in the league.

Military service
He played for the (winning) Third Australian Divisional team in the famous "Pioneer Exhibition Game" of Australian Rules football, held in London, in October 1916. A news film was taken at the match.

See also
 1916 Pioneer Exhibition Game

Footnotes

References
 Post-war photographs at: The Melbourne Herald, (Saturday, 21 May 1921), p.6, The Sporting Globe, (Saturday, 26 September 1925), p.6, and :File:Harry_Moyes_1926.jpg. 
 Pioneer Exhibition Game Australian Football: in aid of British and French Red Cross Societies: 3rd Australian Division v. Australian Training Units at Queen's Club, West Kensington, on Saturday, October 28th, 1916, at 3pm, Wightman & Co., (London), 1919.
 Richardson, N. (2016), The Game of Their Lives, Pan Macmillan Australia: Sydney. 
 First World War Embarkation Roll: Sapper Harold Milne Moyes (10993), collection of the Australian War Memorial.
 First World War Nominal Roll: Sapper Harold Milne Moyes (10993), collection of the Australian War Memorial.
 First World War Service Record: Sapper Harold Milne Moyes (10993), National Archives of Australia.
 Sharland, "Jumbo", "H. Moyes, Brainy and Cool Forward: Digger Who Had Bullet in His Back, The Sporting Globe, (Saturday, 26 September 1925), p.6.

External links 

 Harry Moyes, at Demonwiki.

1896 births
Australian rules footballers from Melbourne
Melbourne Football Club players
St Kilda Football Club players
Participants in "Pioneer Exhibition Game" (London, 28 October 1916)
South Yarra Football Club players
1968 deaths
Melbourne Football Club Premiership players
One-time VFL/AFL Premiership players
People from Prahran, Victoria